Park Sun-ju (born 26 March 1993) is a South Korean footballer who plays as full back for Gwangju FC. His brother Park Sun-yong is also a footballer.

Career
He joined Pohang Steelers before the 2013 season started.

References

External links 

Park Sun-ju at steelers.co.kr

1993 births
Living people
Association football defenders
South Korean footballers
Pohang Steelers players
Gangwon FC players
Gwangju FC players
K League 1 players
K League 2 players
Yonsei University alumni